Punch Drunk  is a British sitcom created and written by Clayton Moore. It was produced by Colin Gilbert of The Comedy Unit, BBC Scotland.

The show ran for 1 series of 6 episodes in 1993 on BBC1. The first episode was directed by Colin Gilbert and the remaining five by Ron Bain.

It starred Kenny Ireland as Vinnie Binns, the owner of a boxing gym, who discovers a young prospect in Hance Glover (John Kazek) after spotting him perform in a pub fracas.

Both Vinnie and Hance hold a candle for Vikki Brown (Diana Hardcastle), the girlfriend of the head of the Doctors Against Boxing organisation, Norman Banks, played by Jonathan Kydd.

Vinnie's seedy boxing arch-rival is Hunter (Sean Scanlan) whose plooky sidekick is Slug (Gilbert Martin).

Other characters were boxing trainer Neillie (Jake D'Arcy), Hance's mother, Mrs Gordon (Claire Nielson), and Danny, a slow-witted boxer at the end of his career, played by Grant Smeaton.

Critical response

From British Comedy Guide 

An excruciatingly poor sitcom which stretched to only one series, one too many for some! Although Diana Hardcastle attracted a few laughs, the show nonetheless fared poorly.

References

1993 British television series debuts
1993 British television series endings
BBC television sitcoms
English-language television shows
Television shows set in Scotland